Hayden Spire is a 12,480+ foot elevation (3,800 meter) pillar located in Rocky Mountain National Park, in Larimer County, Colorado, United States. It is situated 12 miles west of the community of Estes Park in Hayden Gorge, along a short spur on the Continental Divide. Hayden Spire is part of the Front Range which is a subset of the Rocky Mountains. It is the highest tower in a cluster of spires which can be viewed from Forest Canyon Overlook along the Trail Ridge Road. Neighbors include Terra Tomah Mountain two miles to the north, and Mount Julian 1.8 mile to the northwest.

Climate 
According to the Köppen climate classification system, Hayden Spire is located in an alpine subarctic climate zone with cold, snowy winters, and cool to warm summers. Due to its altitude, it receives precipitation all year, as snow in winter, and as thunderstorms in summer, with a dry period in late spring. Precipitation runoff from the mountain drains northeast into the Big Thompson River via Hayden Creek.

Etymology 

Hayden Spire was named in 1911 by Abner Erwin Sprague for Julian Hayden (1886–1964), a civil engineer who settled in Estes Park in 1906. He and his brother Albert fostered much of the development of Estes Park. The mountain's name has been officially adopted by the United States Board on Geographic Names. Nearby Mount Julian is also named after Julian Hayden. Hayden Creek honors both brothers.

See also 

 List of peaks in Rocky Mountain National Park

References

External links 
 Hayden Spire Rock Climbing: Mountainproject.com

Mountains of Larimer County, Colorado
Mountains of Rocky Mountain National Park
Mountains of Colorado
North American 3000 m summits